Thundering Romance is a 1924 American silent Western film directed by Richard Thorpe and starring Jay Wilsey, Jean Arthur and Harry Todd.

Cast
 Jay Wilsey as Lightning Bill 
 Jean Arthur as Mary Watkins
 Rene Picot as Lew Simons
 Harry Todd as Davey Jones
 Lew Meehan as Hank Callahan
 J.P. Lockney as Mark Jennings
 George A. Williams as The Oil Representative
 Lafe McKee as The Sheriff

References

Bibliography
 Connelly, Robert B. The Silents: Silent Feature Films, 1910-36, Volume 40, Issue 2. December Press, 1998.
 Munden, Kenneth White. The American Film Institute Catalog of Motion Pictures Produced in the United States, Part 1. University of California Press, 1997.

External links
 

1924 films
1924 Western (genre) films
1920s English-language films
American silent feature films
Silent American Western (genre) films
American black-and-white films
Films directed by Richard Thorpe
1920s American films